The 2021 Western & Southern Open  was a men's and women's tennis tournament played on outdoor hard courts from August 15–22, 2021, as part of the US Open Series. It was a Masters 1000 tournament on the 2021 ATP Tour and a WTA 1000 tournament on the 2021 WTA Tour.

The 2021 tournament was the 120th men's edition and the 93rd women's edition of the Cincinnati Masters and took place at the Lindner Family Tennis Center in Mason, Ohio, a northern suburb of Cincinnati, in the United States, making its return to Ohio for the first time since the 2019 tournament after being held in New York City for 2020 due to the COVID-19 pandemic in the United States. It operated at full spectator capacity as participants were required to have tested negative for COVID-19 or be fully vaccinated.

Champions

Men's singles

  Alexander Zverev def.  Andrey Rublev, 6–2, 6–3

Women's singles

  Ashleigh Barty def.  Jil Teichmann, 6–3, 6–1

This was Barty's 13th WTA singles title, and fifth of the year.

Men's doubles

  Marcel Granollers /  Horacio Zeballos def.  Steve Johnson /  Austin Krajicek, 7–6(7–5), 7–6(7–5)

Women's doubles

  Samantha Stosur /  Zhang Shuai def.  Gabriela Dabrowski /  Luisa Stefani, 7–5, 6–3

ATP singles main-draw entrants

Seeds
The following were the seeded players. Seedings were based on ATP rankings as of August 9, 2021. Rank and points before were as of August 16, 2021.

For the first time since the ATP Tour resumed from its pandemic suspension in August 2020, ATP rankings points were added and dropped per traditional methodology beginning 23 August 2021 (the rankings after the 2021 Western & Southern Open in Cincinnati).
A player's current Western & Southern Open ATP ranking points (the greater from 2019 and 2020) dropped 23 August 2021 and were replaced with points earned by the player at this year's Western & Southern Open. Those new points would stay on a player's breakdown for 52 weeks, dropping 22 August 2022. Players who had Western & Southern Open points in their breakdown and did not compete in this year's event also had their existing Cincinnati ranking points drop on 23 August 2021.

† The player is also defending points from the 2019 Winston-Salem Open, which was played during this calendar week in 2019.

‡ The player did not qualify for the tournament in 2019 or 2020. Accordingly, points for his 19th best result are deducted instead.

^ Because the 2021 tournament was non-mandatory, the player substituted his 19th best result in place of the points won in this tournament.

Other entrants
The following players received wild cards into the main singles draw:
  Mackenzie McDonald
  Andy Murray
  Brandon Nakashima
  Frances Tiafoe

The following player received entry using a protected ranking into the main singles draw:
  Guido Pella

The following players received entry from the singles qualifying draw:
  Carlos Alcaraz 
  Kevin Anderson 
  Richard Gasquet 
  Marcos Giron
  Corentin Moutet
  Yoshihito Nishioka 
  Tommy Paul

The following player received entry as a lucky loser:
  Dominik Koepfer

Withdrawals
Before the tournament
  Borna Ćorić → replaced by  Sebastian Korda
  Novak Djokovic → replaced by  Jan-Lennard Struff
  Roger Federer → replaced by  Federico Delbonis
  Adrian Mannarino → replaced by  Miomir Kecmanović
  John Millman → replaced by  Dominik Koepfer
  Rafael Nadal → replaced by  Guido Pella
  Kei Nishikori → replaced by  Laslo Đere
  Milos Raonic → replaced by  Benoît Paire
  Dominic Thiem → replaced by  Dominik Koepfer
  Stan Wawrinka → replaced by  Dušan Lajović

ATP doubles main-draw entrants

Seeds

Rankings are as of August 9, 2021.

Other entrants
The following pairs received wildcards into the doubles main draw: 
  Steve Johnson /  Austin Krajicek 
  Nicholas Monroe /  Frances Tiafoe 
  Denis Shapovalov /  Jack Sock

The following pairs received entry as an alternates:
  Marcelo Arévalo /  Fabio Fognini
  Aslan Karatsev /  Dušan Lajović

Withdrawals
Before the tournament
  Wesley Koolhof /  Jean-Julien Rojer → replaced by  Wesley Koolhof /  Jan-Lennard Struff
  Nicolas Mahut /  Fabrice Martin → replaced by  Filip Krajinović /  Fabrice Martin
  Jamie Murray /  Max Purcell  → replaced by  Aslan Karatsev /  Dušan Lajović 
  Denis Shapovalov /  Jack Sock → replaced by  Marcelo Arévalo /  Fabio Fognini

WTA singles main-draw entrants

Seeds

 1 Rankings are as of August 9, 2021

Other entrants
The following players received wild cards into the main singles draw:
  Caty McNally
  Bernarda Pera
  Sloane Stephens
  Samantha Stosur
  Jil Teichmann

The following player received entry using a special exempt into the main singles draw:
  Camila Giorgi

The following players received entry from the singles qualifying draw:
  Leylah Annie Fernandez
  Caroline Garcia 
  Hsieh Su-wei
  Jasmine Paolini 
  Liudmila Samsonova 
  Aliaksandra Sasnovich 
  Heather Watson
  Zhang Shuai

The following player received entry as a lucky loser:
  Rebecca Peterson

Withdrawals
Before the tournament
  Sofia Kenin → replaced by  Magda Linette
  Anastasia Pavlyuchenkova → replaced by  Rebecca Peterson
  Serena Williams → replaced by  Dayana Yastremska

During the tournament
  Simona Halep (right adductor injury)

Retirements
  Paula Badosa (right shoulder injury)
  Jennifer Brady (right knee injury)
  Danielle Collins (exhaustion)
  Petra Kvitová (stomach issue)
  Karolína Muchová (abdominal injury)

WTA doubles main-draw entrants

Seeds

Rankings are as of August 9, 2021.

Other entrants
The following pairs received wildcards into the doubles main draw:
  Magda Linette /  Bernarda Pera 
  Emma Navarro /  Peyton Stearns

The following pairs received entry using protected rankings:
  Anna Danilina /  Yaroslava Shvedova
  Ons Jabeur /  Sania Mirza
  Galina Voskoboeva /  Vera Zvonareva

Withdrawals
Before the tournament
  Sofia Kenin /  Jeļena Ostapenko → replaced by  Jeļena Ostapenko /  Jil Teichmann
  Veronika Kudermetova /  Elena Vesnina → replaced by  Anna Blinkova /  Aliaksandra Sasnovich

Points and prize money

Point distribution

Prize money

*per team

References

External links
 

2021 ATP Tour
2021 WTA Tour
 
2021
Cincinnati
August 2021 sports events in the United States
2021 in American tennis